Jason Marshall (born February 22, 1971) is a Canadian former professional ice hockey defenceman.

Early life
Marshall was born in Cranbrook, British Columbia. He began his career with Team Canada internationally and in the British Columbia Hockey League with the Vernon Lakers.

Career 
While continuing to play with Canada, Marshall joined the Tri-City Americans in the Western Hockey League. He then played several seasons in the International Hockey League (1945–2001), mainly with the Peoria Rivermen and then with the San Diego Gulls (1990–95). His NHL career began after a pass with the St. Louis Blues and joined the Mighty Ducks of Anaheim, with whom he played several seasons. Subsequently, he often changed his teams to two passages over Europe, interrupted by a season with the Mighty Ducks, the first in Czech Extraliga during the lockout of 2004-2005 NHL, the Deutsche Eishockey Liga, where he finished his career in 2008 when he bore the colors of the Frankfurt Lions. Throughout his career, Marshall accumulated several seasons of over 200 penalty minutes. However, during his time in the NHL, he was less penalized, and he never exceeded 189 minutes from 1997 to 1998. 

After retiring from hockey, Marshall completed a degree in architecture from the Cal Poly Pomona College of Environmental Design. Upon graduation, Marshall found employment with Frank Gehry, CC, FAIA, Canadian-born American architect.

Career statistics

Regular season and playoffs

International

External links

1971 births
Baltimore Bandits players
Canadian ice hockey defencemen
Frankfurt Lions players
Houston Aeros (1994–2013) players
Ice hockey people from British Columbia
Kölner Haie players
Living people
Mighty Ducks of Anaheim players
Minnesota Wild players
National Hockey League first-round draft picks
Sportspeople from Cranbrook, British Columbia
Peoria Rivermen (IHL) players
Portland Pirates players
St. Louis Blues draft picks
St. Louis Blues players
San Diego Gulls (IHL) players
San Jose Sharks players
Tri-City Americans players
Washington Capitals players
Vernon Lakers players
Canadian expatriate ice hockey players in Germany
California State Polytechnic University, Pomona alumni